Lanka Bell is the 3rd largest fixed wireless operator and the 3rd largest fixed phone operator with an island wide digital wireless network in Sri Lanka.

Lanka Bell was formed in 1997 as the single largest BOI Company in Sri Lanka with an investment of over US$150 Million. It was subsequently acquired by the privately held diversified conglomerate Milford Holdings (Private) Limited in 2005.

Lanka Bell Services 

 Fixed wireless telephone services
Broadband Internet (4G LTE)
 Internet leased lines 
International private leased circuit
 Managed Services
Internet Data Center
Virtual Private Networks
Multiprotocol Label Switching (MPLS) Services
 Bell Fax (soft Fax solution)
Bulk SMS Solutions
Voice Solutions E1/SIP Trunks

References

Telecommunications companies of Sri Lanka